Digvijaygram is a census town in Jamnagar district  in the state of Gujarat, India.

Demographics
 India census, Digvijaygram had a population of 9,530. Males constitute 53% of the population and females 47%. Digvijaygram has an average literacy rate of 64%, higher than the national average of 59.5%: male literacy is 73% and female literacy is 53%. 14% of Digvijaygram's population is under 6 years of age.

References

Cities and towns in Jamnagar district